Brynhild Grasmoen (January 7, 1929 – December 30, 2000) was an American alpine skier. She competed in two events at the 1948 Winter Olympics.

References

1929 births
2000 deaths
American female alpine skiers
Olympic alpine skiers of the United States
Alpine skiers at the 1948 Winter Olympics
People from Merced, California
20th-century American women